This is the results breakdown of the local elections held in Cantabria on 3 April 1979. The following tables show detailed results in the autonomous community's most populous municipalities, sorted alphabetically.

City control
The following table lists party control in the most populous municipalities, including provincial capitals (shown in bold).

Municipalities

Santander
Population: 174,809

Torrelavega
Population: 54,512

References

Cantabria
1979